Paria may refer to the following :

Places and jurisdictions

Old World 
 Paria, Gujarat, village in Vapi, Valsad, Gujarat, India
 Paria in Proconsulari, an Ancient city and former bishopric, now a Latin titular see in Tunisia
 Paria, of, from, or related to Paros, a Greek island in the central Aegean Sea

Americas 
 Paria (Peru), a mountain in the Andes
 Paria, Bolivia, founded in 1535, the first Spanish settlement in Bolivia.
 Paria, Utah, or Pahreah, a ghost town on the Paria River in Grand Staircase-Escalante National Monument in Utah, United States 
 Paria, a Spanish colonial province of Venezuela, constituting the eastern portion of the country
 Paria Point, a mountain in Zion National Park, Utah
 Paria River, tributary of the Colorado River, United States
 Paria Peninsula, peninsula in Sucre, Venezuela
 Gulf of Paria, gulf on the South of Paria Peninsula, the Orinoco River delta in Venezuela and on west coast of Trinidad
 The name given to North America on the Waldseemüller map.

Arts, entertainment, and media
 Paria (band), an American experimental metal band active from 2001–2010
 Paria (opera) by Stanisław Moniuszko

Other uses 
 Parias, a form of tribute in medieval Spain
 Paria (beetle), a genus of leaf beetle in family Chrysomelidae

See also 
 Pariah (disambiguation)
 Parya (disambiguation)
 Praia (disambiguation)